Greenville is an unincorporated community in eastern Beaver County, Utah, United States.

Description
The community lies along State Route 21 southwest of the city of Beaver (the county seat of Beaver County). Although Greenville is unincorporated, it has a post office, with the ZIP code of 84731.

History
The location of Greenville was originally a camp on the north side of a ford on the Beaver River, along the Mormon Road until 1855. That year, the road was rerouted up river to the crossing at what later became Beaver. Greenville was first settled in 1861. The community was named for the thick green grass which covered the original town site.

See also

References

External links

Populated places established in 1861
Unincorporated communities in Beaver County, Utah
Unincorporated communities in Utah
1861 establishments in Utah Territory